Scattergood Pulls the Strings is a 1941 American comedy film directed by Christy Cabanne and written by Christy Cabanne and Bernard Schubert. It is the sequel to the 1941 film Scattergood Baines. The film stars Guy Kibbee, Bobs Watson, Susan Peters, James Corner, Emma Dunn, Dink Trout and Monte Blue. The film was released on May 23, 1941, by RKO Pictures.

Plot
Store owner Scattergood Baines helps a boy find his runaway father, who has escaped prison after being falsely accused, and a young scientist who is trying to invent a television with colors, while being opposed by his girlfriend's father.

Cast 
Guy Kibbee as Scattergood Baines
Bobs Watson as Jimmy Jordan
Susan Peters as Ruth Savage
James Corner as Urban Downs
Emma Dunn as Mirandy Baines
Dink Trout as Pliny Pickett
Monte Blue as Ben Mott
Carl Stockdale as Squire Pettibone
Paul White as Hipp
Fern Emmett as Clara Potts
Lee 'Lasses' White as Ed Potts
Ann Shoemaker as Mrs. Downs
Gordon Hart as Homer Savage
Howard C. Hickman as Withers
Earle Hodgins as Deputy

References

External links 
 

1941 films
American black-and-white films
Films directed by Christy Cabanne
American comedy films
1941 comedy films
RKO Pictures films
1940s English-language films
1940s American films